Martin's Mill Independent School District is a public school district based in the community of Martin's Mill, Texas (USA).

There are two campuses in Martin's Mill ISD -

Martin's Mill Junior/Senior High School (Grades 7-12) and 
Martin's Mill Elementary (Grades PK-6).

In 2009, the school district was rated "recognized" by the Texas Education Agency.

References

External links
Martin's Mill ISD

School districts in Van Zandt County, Texas